Éric Kossingou (born 6 September 1978 in Paris, France) is a French former professional footballer who played as a defender. He made 43 appearances in Ligue 2 for ASOA Valence between 1999 and 2004.

References

Living people
1978 births
French sportspeople of Central African Republic descent
French footballers
Footballers from Paris
Association football defenders
Ligue 2 players
ASOA Valence players